Cameraria australisella is a moth of the family Gracillariidae. It is known from the Illinois and Texas in the United States. The type locality is in Bosque County, Texas.

The larvae feed on Quercus alba and Quercus imbricaria. They mine the leaves of their host plant.

References

australisella

Lepidoptera of the United States
Moths of North America
Moths described in 1878
Taxa named by Vactor Tousey Chambers
Leaf miners